The Convention on the Participation of Foreigners in Public Life at Local Level is a treaty of the Council of Europe, adopted in 1992. It grants foreigners the right to vote in local elections, provided that they fulfil the same legal requirements as apply to citizens and have been lawful and habitual residents in the State concerned for the five years preceding the elections. The convention came into force in 1997, after the fourth ratification. As of July 2015, the Convention has been ratified by nine member states. Four states have signed the convention, but not ratified it.

References

External links
 Text of the Convention

Council of Europe treaties
Election law
Immigration law
Local government
Treaties concluded in 1992
Treaties entered into force in 1997
Immigration to Europe
1992 in Europe
1997 in Europe
Treaties of Albania
Treaties of the Czech Republic
Treaties of Denmark
Treaties of Finland
Treaties of Iceland
Treaties of Italy
Treaties of the Netherlands
Treaties of Norway
Treaties of Sweden
1992 in France
Right of foreigners to vote